Sivagangai is a state assembly constituency in Sivagangai district in Tamil Nadu. It is one of the 234 State Legislative Assembly Constituencies in Tamil Nadu, in India.

The current Member of Legislative Assembly (MLA) of the constituency is Cholan CT. Palanichamy from the AIADMK Party. It is one of the 234 State Legislative Assembly Constituencies in Tamil Nadu, in India.

Madras State

Tamil Nadu 
From the 1977 elections, the assembly seat was won by Dravida Munnetra Kazhagam (DMK) twice during the 1989 and 1996 elections; the Communist Party of India once during the 2006 elections; Indian National Congress three times during 1977, 1980 and 1984 elections and the All India Anna Dravida Munnetra Kazhagam (AIADMK) three times during the 1991, 2001 and 2011 elections.

Election results

2021

2016

2011

2006

2001

1996

1991

1989

1984

1980

1977

1971

1967

1962

1957

1952

References 

 

Assembly constituencies of Tamil Nadu
Sivaganga district